The Josiah B. and Sara Moore House is a house in Villisca, Iowa, United States.  The house was the site of the 1912 brutal murder of eight people, including six children. A documentary has been made about the murder, which remains unsolved. The house was renovated in the 1990s and serves as the Villisca Axe Murder House.

History
Josiah Moore and his family bought the house in 1903 and lived there until 1912. On the night of June 9, 1912, the six members of the Moore family and two house guests were bludgeoned to death in the residence. All eight victims, including six children, had severe head wounds inflicted with an axe. The murders were reputedly so horrifying that it is said that they took the sinking of the RMS Titanic, which occurred about two months earlier, off the front page of the newspapers.

House

Renovation
The house was built in 1868, on lot 310. After the murders, the house went through the possession of eight people, the most recent acquisition occurring in 1994 by Darwin Linn.  He and his wife successfully restored the house to its original condition at the time of the murders. In 1997, the house was added to the National Register of Historic Places. The Iowa Historic Preservation Alliance recognized the site with the Preservation at its Best award in 1997.

Alleged haunting

Multiple paranormal investigations were conducted at the house, resulting in many EVPs, videos, and photographs, leading the creators of Ghost Adventures to suggest that the house is haunted.

See also
National Register of Historic Places listings in Montgomery County, Iowa
National Register of Historic Places listings in Iowa

References

External links

 Villisca Axe Murder House

Houses completed in 1868
Houses in Montgomery County, Iowa
National Register of Historic Places in Montgomery County, Iowa
Houses on the National Register of Historic Places in Iowa
Queen Anne architecture in Iowa
Museums in Montgomery County, Iowa
Reportedly haunted locations in Iowa
1868 establishments in Iowa